GnuTLS (the GNU Transport Layer Security Library) is a free software implementation of the TLS, SSL and DTLS protocols. It offers an application programming interface (API) for applications to enable secure communication over the network transport layer, as well as interfaces to access X.509, PKCS #12, OpenPGP and other structures.

Features 
GnuTLS consists of a library that allows client applications to start secure sessions using the available protocols.
It also provides command-line tools, including an X.509 certificate manager, a test client and server, and random key and password generators.

GnuTLS has the following features:
 TLS 1.3, TLS 1.2, TLS 1.1, TLS 1.0, and SSL 3.0 protocols
 Datagram TLS (DTLS) 1.2, and DTLS 1.0, protocols
 TLS-SRP: Secure remote password protocol (SRP) for TLS authentication
 TLS-PSK: Pre-shared key (PSK) for TLS authentication
 X.509 and OpenPGP certificate handling
 CPU assisted cryptography and cryptographic accelerator support (/dev/crypto), VIA PadLock and AES-NI instruction sets
 Support for smart cards and for hardware security modules
 Storage of cryptographic keys in the system's Trusted Platform Module (TPM)

History

Origin 
GnuTLS was initially created around March 2003 by Nikos Mavrogiannopoulos to allow applications of the GNU Project to use secure protocols such as TLS. Although OpenSSL already existed, OpenSSL's license is not compatible with the GPL; thus software under the GPL, such as GNU software, could not use OpenSSL without making a GPL linking exception.

License  
The GnuTLS library was licensed originally under the GNU Lesser General Public License v2, while included applications use the GNU General Public License.

In August 2011 the library was updated to the LGPLv3. After it was noticed that there were new license compatibility problems introduced, especially with other free software with the license change, after discussions the license was downgraded again to LGPLv2.1 in March 2013.

Split from GNU 
GnuTLS was created for the GNU Project, but in December 2012 its maintainer, Nikos Mavrogiannopoulos, dissociated the project from GNU after policy disputes with the Free Software Foundation. Richard Stallman opposed this move and suggested forking the project instead. Soon afterward, developer Paolo Bonzini ended his maintainership of GNU Sed and Grep, expressing concerns similar to those of GnuTLS maintainer Mavrogiannopoulos.

Deployment 

Software packages using GnuTLS include(d):

 GNOME
 CenterIM
 Exim
 WeeChat
 Mutt
 Wireshark
 slrn
 Lynx
 CUPS
 gnoMint
 GNU Emacs
 Synology DiskStation Manager
 OpenConnect

See also 

 Comparison of TLS implementations
 wolfSSL (previously CyaSSL)
 mbed TLS (previously PolarSSL)
List of free and open-source software packages
 Network Security Services

References

External links 
 
 GNU Friends - An Interview with GNU TLS developer Nikos Mavroyanopoulos – a 2003 interview
 Fellowship interview with Simon Josefsson – a 2009 interview

Cryptographic software
GNU Project software
Free security software
Transport Layer Security implementation